Sylvenstein Dam is an earthen  embankment dam  in the Isar valley, in the alpine part of Upper Bavaria, Germany which impounds the Sylvenstein Reservoir.

In the 1920s, several hydropower plants were built in the tributary of the upper Isar river such as ones at the Achensee and Lake Walchen Power Plant. Therefore, the river ran nearly dry during the dry season, and the low water flow affected the town of Bad Tölz. A reservoir was established to ensure a minimum level of water in the river. During the dry season a volumetric flow of 4 cubic metres per second is released to prevent the Isar from running dry. Additionally, the reservoir provides flood control for Isar river between Bad Tölz and Munich.

It was built between 1954 and 1959. Since 1959, the water has also been used to operate a hydropower plant of 3.2 MW. The plant was upgraded in 2000 with new turbines to generate 3.8 MW.

During the 2005 European floods, the maximum capacity of the reservoir was reached. Consequently, excess water was released into the Isar river. Without the dam construction, the flooding in 2005 would have been even more severe than it actually was.

A small village named Fall was flooded in 1959. The Faller-Klamm-Brücke connects road traffic to the North (Bundesstraße 307).

External links 
 
 Information and photographs 

Dams in Bavaria
Lakes of Bavaria
Hydroelectric power stations in Germany
Dams completed in 1959
Bad Tölz-Wolfratshausen